Fatin Zakirah Zain Jalany (born 15 March 1997, in Kelantan) is a Malaysian rhythmic gymnast. She was part of the Malaysian team that won the bronze medal in the women's rhythmic team all-around event at the 2014 Commonwealth Games.

External links
 
 
 

1997 births
Living people
People from Kelantan
Malaysian rhythmic gymnasts
Commonwealth Games bronze medallists for Malaysia
Gymnasts at the 2014 Commonwealth Games
Commonwealth Games medallists in gymnastics
Malaysian people of Malay descent
Malaysian Muslims
Medallists at the 2014 Commonwealth Games